Hughenden–Muttaburra–Aramac–Barcaldine Road is a continuous  road route in the Flinders and Barcaldine local government areas of Queensland, Australia. It is designated as State Route 19. It has three official names, Hughenden–Muttaburra Road (number 5701), Muttaburra–Aramac Road (number 572), and Barcaldine–Aramac Road (number 573). Each component is a state-controlled district road, rated as a local road of regional significance (LRRS).

Route description
It proceeds south through  before entering the locality of  Here it runs through the former locality of Tablederry, passing the exit to Prairie Road to the north-east, and the Geographical Centre of Queensland to the west.

Before reaching the town of Muttaburra the road passes the exit to Cramsie–Muttaburra Road to the west, and takes the name of that road from there to the town. It enters the town from the north and exits to the east, having changed its name to Muttaburra–Aramac Road. In the town it passes the Muttaburrasaurus Interpretation Centre to the south. After leaving the town the road turns south-east, passes the exit to Crossmoor Road to the south, and runs through the former locality of Sardine, where it passes the exit to Aramac–Torrens Creek Road to the north.

In  the road turns south as Barcaldine–Aramac Road. It passes the exit to Ilfracombe–Aramac Road to the south-west, and continues south through the former localities of Ibis and Ingberry. Reaching  it ends at an intersection with the Capricorn Highway.

Upgrade of Barcaldine–Aramac Road

Other roads
The following state-controlled district roads, each rated as a local road of regional significance (LRRS), intersect with the Hughenden–Muttaburra–Aramac–Barcaldine Road:

Aramac–Torrens Creek Road

This road starts at an intersection with the Muttaburra–Aramac Road in Aramac.

Upgrade of Aramac–Torrens Creek Road

Cramsie–Muttaburra Road

It runs concurrent with that road to the town.

Upgrade of Cramsie–Muttaburra Road
A project to pave and seal the last  of the Cramsie–Muttaburra Road, at a cost of $9.54 million, was completed in December 2022.

Ilfracombe–Aramac Road

History
Hughenden pastoral run was established in 1863. By 1864 several other runs had been taken up in the district. A township was started in 1866, and the town was surveyed in 1877. In 1887 the railway arrived and the town became a Municipality. With the arrival of the railway the town became the hub for a large number of carriers, transporting goods, mail, and passengers to outlying areas. One such run was that established between Hughenden and Muttaburra. It took two days each way, with passengers accommodated at a hotel in Tangorin overnight.

European settlement occurred in the Aramac district from 1862, and the township of Muttaburra was proclaimed in 1878. The site for the town of Aramac was declared in 1869 and surveyed in 1875.

Barcaldine Downs pastoral run was established in 1863. It was partly resumed for closer settlement in the 1880s. The town was established in 1885 and surveyed in 1886. The railway also arrived in 1886.

Major intersections
All distances are from Google Maps.

See also

 List of road routes in Queensland
 List of numbered roads in Queensland

References

Roads in Queensland